Camilla Fogagnolo (born 31 May 1986) is an Australian weightlifter.

She competed at the 2015 World Weightlifting Championships, 2019 Australian  Arnold strongwoman championships, 2020 Arnold Amateur Strongwoman World Championships.

References

External links 

Australian Weightlifting Federation > STATISTICS > LIFTER (awf.com.au)
Camilla Fogagnolo Snatch 88

Living people
Australian female weightlifters
1986 births
20th-century Australian women
21st-century Australian women